"What It Takes" is a song recorded by Canadian country music artist Adam Gregory. It is the second single from Crazy Days, his first album to be released in the United States. The song has reached top 40 on the Billboard Hot Country Songs chart in the United States.

Chart positions

References

2008 singles
Adam Gregory songs
Songs written by Lee Brice
Songs written by Kyle Jacobs (songwriter)
Big Machine Records singles
Midas Records Nashville singles
Music videos directed by Roman White
Songs written by Joe Leathers
2008 songs